There are over 20,000 Grade II* listed buildings in England.  This page is a list of these buildings in the county of the Isle of Wight.

Isle of Wight

|}

See also
Grade I listed buildings on the Isle of Wight

Notes

References

External links
 English Heritage Images of England

 
Isle of Wight
Lists of listed buildings on the Isle of Wight